Ministry of Public Security can refer to:

 Ministry of Justice and Public Security (Brazil)
 Ministry of Public Security of Burundi
 Ministry of Public Security (China)
 Ministry of Public Security of Costa Rica that supervises the Public Force of Costa Rica
 Ministry of Public Security (Israel) 
 Ministry of Public Security (Mexico City)
 Ministry of Justice and Security (Netherlands)
 Ministry of Public Security (North Korea)
 Ministry of Public Security of Panama that supervises the Panamanian Public Forces
 Ministry of Public Security (Poland)
 Ministry of Public Security (Quebec)
 Ministry of Public Security (Vietnam)

Similar agencies
 United States Department of Homeland Security

See also
 Interior ministry
 Ministry for State Security (disambiguation)